Kultaban (Kültaban) is a rural locality (a village) in Zilairsky Selsoviet, Baymaksky District, Bashkortostan, Russia. The population was 364 as of 2010. There are 3 streets.

Geography 
Kultaban is located 44 km east of Baymak (the district's administrative centre) by road. Sibay is the nearest rural locality.

References 

Rural localities in Baymaksky District